UC: Undercover is an American procedural drama television series created by Shane Salerno and Don Winslow. The series premiered on the NBC network on September 30, 2001. The series ran for one season of 13 episodes, finishing its run on March 23, 2002. It focused on the secret lives and private demons of an elite Justice Department crime-fighting unit that confronted the United States' deadliest, most untouchable lawbreakers by going undercover to bust them.

The screenplays were either solely written or co-written by Salerno. James Bond composer David Arnold wrote the main title theme and scored the pilot episode. Salerno said the show was a "very music driven series." UC: Undercover was a production of NBC Studios, in association with Jersey Television, Chasing Time Pictures, Regency Television, and 20th Century Fox Television. The series' short but popular run ended when it was canceled by the network. The show developed a passionate following overseas and continues to run on FX International.

Plot

The unit is headed by authoritative Frank Donovan (Oded Fehr), with undercover agents Jake Shaw (Jon Seda) and Alex Cross (Vera Farmiga), psychological profiler Monica Davis (Bruklin Harris), and young techno-wizard Cody (Jarrad Paul), who runs all of the high-tech surveillance operations.

As a federal team, the group responds to emergencies all over the country: taking down elite bank robbers, drug kingpins, domestic terrorists, spies, jewel thieves, and corrupt cops. The drama's character-driven storylines emphasize the taut, cat-and-mouse game played by the undercover agents as they attempt to infiltrate the lives of a gallery of criminals, including murderous master thief Jack "Sonny" Walker (William Forsythe) and imprisoned drug lord Carlos Cortez (Steven Bauer).

The series also explores the psychological toll undercover work takes on the agents who play this deadly game of false identities and who commit treachery as a daily profession for the greater good. The team often butts heads with Paul Bloom (Brian Markinson), their obstructive and fiercely ambitious Justice Department boss.

Cast

Main
 Oded Fehr as Frank Donovan
 Jon Seda as Jake Shaw
 Vera Farmiga as Alex Cross
 Bruklin Harris as Monica Davis
 Jarrad Paul as Cody
 William Forsythe as Sonny Walker

Recurring
 Angie Everhart as Carly
 Steven Bauer as Carlos Cortez
 Ving Rhames as Quito Real
 James Handy as Priest
 Bill Mondy as Scott Charles
 N'Bushe Wright as Keisha
 Grant Show as John Keller
 Brian Markinson as Paul Bloom
 Gabrielle Miller as Vanessa

Episodes

Reception

Critical response
The New York Times called it a "fast paced, good-looking series," and Variety wrote that series lead Oded Fehr is a "commanding and interesting addition to television." Variety added that "technical credits are comparable to theatrical quality" which led the series winning awards for cinematography and sound. The show received a high 7.3 out of 10 from viewers on TV.com. USA Today Robert Bianco gave it one star and said it was "pretentious, incoherent and so visually hyper it borders on nauseating."

Awards and nominations

References

External links
 Official Website
 
 
 

NBC original programming
2000s American crime drama television series
2000s American police procedural television series
2001 American television series debuts
2002 American television series endings
American action television series
Television series by Universal Television
Television series by 20th Century Fox Television
Television shows set in Washington, D.C.